Buonabitacolo is a town and comune in the province of Salerno in the Campania region of south-western Italy.

See also
Vallo di Diano

References

Cities and towns in Campania
Localities of Cilento